Victoria Azarenka and Olga Govortsova were the defending champions, and decided not to play together. Govortsova competed with Alisa Kleybanova but lost in the semifinals to Azarenka and her partner Ágnes Szávay.

Azarenka and Szávay defeated Marina Erakovic and Monica Niculescu in the final, 6–7(5–7), 6–2, 6–0 to win the girls' doubles tennis title at the 2005 Wimbledon Championships.

Seeds

  Victoria Azarenka /  Ágnes Szávay (champions)
  Marina Erakovic /  Monica Niculescu (final)
  Bibiane Schoofs /  Caroline Wozniacki (semifinals)
  Alexa Glatch /  Vania King (first round)
  Raluca Olaru /  Amina Rakhim (quarterfinals)
  Chan Yung-jan /  Nikola Fraňková (second round)
  Dominika Cibulková /  Anna Tatishvili (second round)
  Jennifer-Lee Heinser /  Elizabeth Plotkin (quarterfinals)

Draw

Finals

Top half

Bottom half

References

External links

Girls' Doubles
Wimbledon Championship by year – Girls' doubles